Glycine methyl ester hydrochloride is the organic compound with the formula [CH3O2CCH2NH3]Cl.  A white, water-soluble solid, it is the hydrochloride of the methyl ester of the amino acid glycine.

Synthesis and reactions
Glycine methyl ester hydrochloride can be prepared by treatment of glycine with 2 equivalents of trimethylsilyl chloride, followed by the addition of methanol.

Upon treatment with base, the salt converts to glycine methyl ester.

Glycine methyl ester (and other esters of glycine) are not shelf-stable, tending to polymerize when stored at room temperature or convert to diketopiperazine. The hydrochloride is shelf-stable.

References

 
Amino acid derivatives
Chlorides